Anuraag  is a 1972 Indian Hindi-language drama film, directed by Shakti Samanta. The film stars Moushumi Chatterjee in her debut as a heroine and Vinod Mehra in lead roles. The Shakti Samanta fixture Rajesh Khanna, having earlier made Aradhana (1969) and Kati Patang with Samanta, makes a special appearance.  The music is by S. D. Burman. Initially, Shakti Samanta was thinking whether to make this film or not as he was not sure if the distributors would buy a film with such a story line and had shared the idea with Rajesh Khanna, who encouraged Samanta and volunteered to make an extended appearance for the film, and also distributed the film under the banner "Shakti-Raj" (indicating Shakti Samanta and Rajesh Khanna).

The film became a semi-hit, while doing extremely well in big cities. and won the Filmfare Best Movie Award for the year. It was later remade into the Telugu film "Anuraagaalu" (1975) with Sridevi in her first leading role.  A. Bhimsingh also remade it in Malayalam as Raagam (1975). It was also remade in Tamil as Neela Malargal (1979), and in Kannada as Chiranjeevi, with Manjula and Srinath.

Plot
A blind sculptor, Shivani (Moushumi Chatterjee) stays in an ashram and makes friends with a young boy (Satyajit), who is suffering from cancer. She falls in love with Rajesh (Vinod Mehra). Rajesh asks his parents to permit him to marry her, to which his mother agrees, but his father refuses. Then, an eye specialist reveals that an eye replacement would cure her. Later, as a dying wish, the young boy donates his eyes to her.

Cast
 Ashok Kumar - Mr. Shiv Shankar Rai/Rai Saheb
 Nutan - Anu Rai (Rai Saheb's daughter-in-law)
 Rajesh Khanna - Gangaram, shopkeeper (Guest appearance)
 Vinod Mehra - Rajesh
 Moushmi Chatterjee - Shivani 
 Master Satyajeet - Chandan Rai, grandson of Rai Saheb
 Nasir Hussain - Anu's Father
 Murad - Eye Specialist
 David
 Asit Sen - D'Souza
 Madan Puri - Amirchand, Rajesh's father
 Anita Guha - Rajesh's Mother
 Abhi Bhattacharya - Hari
 Satyen Kappu - Dr. Sunil

Music

The soundtrack of the film contains 5 songs. The music is composed by S.D. Burman, with lyrics by Anand Bakshi

Awards and nominations

 21st Filmfare Awards:

Won

 Best Film – Shakti Films
 Special Award – Rajesh Khanna

Nominated

 Best Actress – Moushumi Chatterjee
 Best Supporting Actress – Nutan
 Best Story – Shakti Samanta

References

External links 
 

1972 films
Indian films about cancer
Indian drama films
1970s Hindi-language films
Films scored by S. D. Burman
Films directed by Shakti Samanta
Films about blind people in India
Hindi films remade in other languages
1972 drama films
Hindi-language drama films